NLV Pharos is a lighthouse tender operated by the Northern Lighthouse Board (NLB), the body responsible for the operation of lighthouses and marine navigation aids around the coasts of Scotland and the Isle of Man.

History
Pharos and  her sister ship,  (2006) were built by Stocznia Remontowa, Gdańsk, Poland as part of a £38 million contract. Galatea serves the same role for Trinity House on the coast of England, Wales and the Channel Islands.

Pharos is the tenth NLB vessel to carry the name, replacing the ninth Pharos in March 2007. The first Pharos, which operated as a lighthouse vessel from 1799 to 1810, was a simple wooden sloop 49 feet long (approx 15 metres) and 18 feet wide (approx 5½ metres).

Pharos was the great lighthouse of Alexandria, one of the Seven Wonders of the Ancient World.

Service
NLV Pharos is based in Oban and works mainly in Scottish and Manx waters, servicing over 200 automatic lighthouses, buoys and beacons. She is also able to carry out hydrographic surveying and wreck finding and other commercial work under contract.

References

Ships of Scotland
2006 ships
Lighthouse tenders of the United Kingdom